Frank Reynolds (1876 in London - April 1953) was a British artist. Son of an artist, he studied at Heatherley's School of Art. His work was part of the painting event in the art competition at the 1928 Summer Olympics.

Biography
Reynolds had a drawing called A provincial theatre company on tour published in The Graphic on 30 November 1901. In 1906, he began contributing to Punch magazine and was regularly published within its pages during World War I, noted for his anti-Kaiser illustrations in Punch.  A collection of 199 of his illustrations is in the Punch archives.

He was well known for his many illustrations in several books by Charles Dickens, including David Copperfield (c1911), The Pickwick Papers (c1912) and The Old Curiosity Shop (c1913). He succeeded F. H. Townsend as the Art Editor for Punch.

Reynolds was one of the leading illustrators selected by Percy Bradshaw for inclusion in his The Art of the Illustrator (1917-1918) which presented a separate portfolio for each of twenty illustrators. He was also a prolific watercolour painter and was a member of the Royal Institute of Painters in Water Colours from 1903. He continued to illustrate in black and white or in colours all his life. He became known in the 1930s and through the Second World War for characters called The Bristlewoods.

One of his more notable works is entitled Jingle.

His journal contributions included 
London Magazine
The Sketch
Punch (magazine)
Windsor Magazine
The Illustrated London News

Notes

References

External links

 Punch pictures by Frank Reynolds, 1922 London: Cassell and Co.

1876 births
1953 deaths
Alumni of the Heatherley School of Fine Art
British cartoonists
British comics artists
Punch (magazine) cartoonists
Olympic competitors in art competitions